William Henry Dinsmore (14 February 1887 – 11 November 1967) was an Australian rules footballer who played with Fitzroy, Essendon and St Kilda in the Victorian Football League (VFL).

Notes

External links 

1887 births
1967 deaths
Australian rules footballers from Melbourne
Fitzroy Football Club players
Essendon Football Club players
St Kilda Football Club players
People educated at Wesley College (Victoria)
People from Prahran, Victoria